Williams House, also known as the John Wilson Williams House, is a historic home located near Ulmer, Allendale County, South Carolina. The house consists of a residence built about 1800, with an addition built about 1906. It is a -story, three-bay, lateral gable-roofed, log and clapboard hall and parlor farmhouse. The main body of the house consists of two rooms measuring approximately 30 feet by 16 feet. The Williams Home Place has remained continually in the same family for more than 200 years.

It was added to the National Register of Historic Places in 1999.

References

Houses on the National Register of Historic Places in South Carolina
Houses completed in 1800
Houses in Allendale County, South Carolina
National Register of Historic Places in Allendale County, South Carolina